The Broken Wall Memorial is an outdoor memorial installed on the University of Portland campus in Portland, Oregon, United States. It started with the Praying Hands Memorial, dedicated in 1948, and was expanded and rededicated in its current form  on Veterans Day in 1990.  The memorial commemorates World War I, Korean War, Vietnam War and Gulf War service members associated with the university, and features inscriptions of select names. Vigils are held at the site each Veterans Day.

See also
 1948 in art

References

External links
 

1948 establishments in Oregon
1948 sculptures
1990 establishments in Oregon
Gulf War memorials
Korean War memorials and cemeteries
Military monuments and memorials in the United States
Monuments and memorials in Portland, Oregon
Outdoor sculptures in Portland, Oregon
University of Portland campus
Vietnam War memorials
World War I memorials in the United States